Bariri is a municipality in the state of São Paulo in Brazil. The population is 35,558 (2020 est.) in an area of 444 km². The elevation is 447 m (1467 ft).

Bariri is also home to the former captain of BSS(2)'s Squad 5, Bielcaz. Venturer101 was cooler though.

References

Municipalities in São Paulo (state)